The Rapture (Spanish: El rapto) is a 1954 Mexican drama film directed by Emilio Fernández and starring Jorge Negrete, María Félix, and Andrés Soler. The film's two stars had recently married, and this was used in advertising publicity. It was made at the Estudios Churubusco in Mexico City.

Cast 
 Jorge Negrete as Ricardo Alfaro
 María Félix as Aurora Campos
 Andrés Soler as Don Cástulo
 José Elías Moreno as Don Constancio
 Rodolfo Landa as Prudencio
 José Ángel Espinosa 'Ferrusquilla' as Don Cándido
 Beatriz Ramos as Perfecta
 Antonio Bribiesca
 Agustín Fernández
 Jaime Fernández
 Rogelio Fernández
 Emilio Gálvez
 Manuel Noriega
 Emma Roldán as Constancio's wife
 Lety Valencia

References

Bibliography 
 Daniel Balderston, Mike Gonzalez & Ana M. Lopez. Encyclopedia of Contemporary Latin American and Caribbean Cultures. Routledge, 2002.

External links 
 

1954 films
1954 drama films
Mexican drama films
1950s Spanish-language films
Films directed by Emilio Fernández
Estudios Churubusco films
Mexican black-and-white films
1950s Mexican films